The Conformist (Il conformista) is a novel by Alberto Moravia published in 1951, which details the life and desire for normality of a government official during Italy's fascist period. It is also known for the 1970 film adaptation by Bernardo Bertolucci.

Synopsis

Prologue
In the prologue, the reader witnesses numerous formative events from a short period in Marcello's childhood. In the first, Marcello coldly kills several lizards in the yard between his home and the home of his neighbor and friend, Roberto. He tries to coax Roberto into offering approval of this behavior, and when Roberto doesn’t comply, they fight and Roberto leaves. Marcello later obtains a slingshot and fires a few stones through the ivy that covers the fence around Roberto's family's house, only to find that he has killed their family cat instead of Roberto. Marcello is mortified not so much by his actions but by what he perceives as the abnormality of his sentiments.

Marcello also witnesses a fight between his parents that is later revealed to mark the beginning of his father's decline into mental illness. Marcello's mother and housemaid discover that his father has vandalized a photograph of Marcello and his mother by poking holes through their eyes and drawing streaks of blood on their faces. His father ultimately chases his mother around the house and attacks her in the bedroom, leaving Marcello torn between whether to rescue his mother or aid his father. It is revealed that Marcello's father often physically abuses the boy.

The final section of the prologue covers Marcello's torment at the hands of his classmates, who use his somewhat effeminate appearance to question his gender. One day, five classmates follow Marcello home from school and try to force him to wear a skirt, but their attack is interrupted by a chauffeur who happens on the scene and offers to drive Marcello home. En route, the chauffeur appears to proposition Marcello, offering him a pistol in exchange for unspecified actions. The chauffeur, who reveals himself to be a former priest de-frocked for indecent behavior, ultimately stops himself before initiating any actions with Marcello and begs the boy to ignore him if he tries to speak to him again. Marcello doesn’t fully understand what is happening, and his desire for the pistol leads him to go with the chauffeur again a few days later. This time, the chauffeur, named Lino, locks himself in the room with Marcello and tells the boy that he won’t be able to escape the (still unspoken) abuse to come. During the struggle, Lino's gun comes loose and Marcello grabs it. When Lino tells Marcello to shoot him, he complies and flees out the window.

Part I
Part I opens with Marcello, now a state employee of the Italian Fascist government, looking through old newspaper clippings for information on the incident with Lino. He ultimately finds an obituary that blames the death on an accident during the cleaning of the gun. While Marcello does not feel true remorse, he does seek some absolution for this incident throughout the novel.

A colleague of Marcello named Orlando asks Marcello to participate in a mission to Paris. A former professor of Marcello, named Quadri, is now an anti-fascist agitator, and the Italian government would like to infiltrate his organization. Marcello is also due to be married shortly to a woman named Giulia, and offers to take his honeymoon in Paris so that his presence there would not be suspicious to Quadri.

Marcello also takes confession, despite his apparent atheism, as a prelude to the Catholic wedding his wife expects. He confesses to murdering Lino, and the priest indicates that he can seek absolution if he feels true remorse for his actions – an emotion that Marcello does not appear capable of feeling.

The section closes in the days leading up to Marcello's wedding, and we see his mother-in-law lavishing praise upon him, in stark contrast to his mother, who now lives alone in squalor. His father has been in an asylum for six years and suffers from the delusion that he is one of Mussolini's top aides. On the way to see his father, Marcello's mother gives him a wedding present but indicates that she won’t be attending the ceremony. Marcello and his mother make their monthly visit to his father, who neither recognizes them nor even acknowledges their presence.

Part II
Part II covers the honeymoon and the odd interpersonal relationships that unfold between Marcello, Giulia, Quadri, and Quadri's voluptuous young wife, Anna. En route to Paris, Marcello makes a scheduled stop at a brothel in a small, unnamed town in France, where he is to meet Agent Orlando for further instructions. At the brothel, Marcello is mistaken for a client, causing him some embarrassment before Orlando arrives to tell him that the new plan is to kill Quadri. Marcello needs simply to confirm Quadri's identity to Orlando to fulfill his duties. As he is leaving, Marcello realizes he has forgotten his hat, but when he goes to retrieve it, he finds Orlando with his arm around a prostitute to whom Marcello feels a strange attraction.

Marcello experiences the same feeling when he and Giulia head to Quadri's apartment, as Anna reminds him in some ways of that prostitute, and Marcello tells himself that he is in love with Anna despite her apparent dislike for him. Anna allows Marcello to begin to seduce her, but always keeps him at arm's length, even telling him that she and Quadri are aware that he is a spy there in service of the Italian government.

While Anna and Giulia head out shopping, Marcello is accosted by an old man who first mistakes him for a beggar, and then mistakes him for a homosexual or perhaps a prostitute, revisiting the humiliation of the incident with Lino on Marcello. When the old man refuses to take Marcello back to his hotel, Marcello pulls his gun and demands to be let out of the vehicle.

Marcello's feelings for Anna intensify alongside a growing contempt for her when he sees her attempting to seduce Giulia and realizes that her interest in him is merely for show. Anna's pursuit of Giulia leads to an argument in a nightclub where Giulia tells Anna that she is not a lesbian and has no interest in an affair.

At a dinner, Quadri asks Marcello to post a letter for him on his way back to Italy, as Quadri's activities are monitored and the letter might be intercepted otherwise. Marcello refuses, and Quadri takes this as a sign of solidarity, as Marcello could have taken the letter and turned it over to the authorities instead. However, Marcello does confirm Quadri's identity to Orlando, and on a trip to Savoy, Quadri – as well as Anna, who left with him in response to Giulia's rejection – is killed by Orlando and his men.

Epilogue
The epilogue briefly explores Marcello's conflicted responses to his role in the murders of Quadri and Lino, including his attempts to rationalize away his culpability. The epilogue takes place years later, on the night that Mussolini falls from power. Giulia reveals that she has long suspected that Marcello was involved in the murders, but her sorrow is more for their own safety than for Marcello's victims or his duplicity.

The two go out for a drive and walk that evening, and while Giulia tries to convince Marcello to make love to her in a wooded area, a stranger arrives and calls to Marcello by name. Marcello is floored to see that it is Lino. Marcello shows real emotion for the first time in the book when he screams at Lino and blames him for ruining his life by taking his innocence. Lino defends himself by arguing that the loss of innocence is inevitable and is merely a part of the human experience—“That’s normality,” says Lino. That speech leads Marcello to the beginning of acceptance of his own non-conformity.

The novel's closing passage has Marcello, Giulia, and their daughter driving to the mountains to evade possible reprisals for Marcello's role with the government. En route, they drive into an air raid, and their car is strafed with bullets. Giulia and the daughter are killed in the first wave, and Marcello falls out of the car, wounded. Realizing his wife and daughter are dead, he waits for the second wave to return. The novel ends with Marcello hearing the planes approach.

Major themes
Marcello spends the entire novel in a search for what he perceives to be a normal life - normal activities, a normal appearance, normal emotions, and so on. However, he confuses normality with conformity, and in his quest to conform, subjugates his already repressed emotions. When the natural course of his life presents him with ethical dilemmas - the assignment to betray Professor Quadri, his attraction to women other than his wife - he is ill-prepared to deal with them. Moravia also intimates a connection between sexual repression and fascism.

See also

 The Garden of the Finzi-Continis - another Italian novel and film about life during Mussolini's regime.

External links
 .

1951 novels
Novels by Alberto Moravia
20th-century Italian novels
Italian novels adapted into films
Novels set in Italy
Works about Italian fascism